The Down Under Fan Fund, also known as DUFF, was created in 1970 for the purpose of providing funds to bring well-known and popular members of science fiction fandom familiar to fans on both sides of the Pacific Ocean.

History

DUFF was created by John Foyster in 1970 as a means of increasing the face-to-face communication between science fiction fans in Australia and New Zealand, and North America.  It coincides with the push within Australian fandom to host the World Science Fiction Convention in Australia in 1975, (Aussiecon), and the rise of fanzine fandom centred on Melbourne, Australia; e.g. Australian SF Review, SF Commentary, ANZAPA. He based the procedures of DUFF on the already-existing Trans-Atlantic Fan Fund (TAFF), which began in 1952.

Funding

DUFF is funded through the support of fandom. Candidates are voted on by interested fans all over the world, and each vote is accompanied by a donation of not less than $US5 or A$6. These donations, and the continued generosity of fandom, are what make the whole concept of these fan funds possible.

In addition to donations, fans hold auctions at science fiction conventions to raise money for DUFF.  Frequently art, books, T-shirts, and other ephemera of fandom are auctioned off for this purpose.

Procedure

Each candidate posts a bond, promising to travel (if elected) to a major convention on the other side of the Pacific; and has provided signed nominations and a platform.

Voting is by secret ballot, using instant-runoff voting; and is open to anyone who has been active in fandom for the prior year or more and who contributes to the Fund. Ballots are signed, to prevent ballot-box stuffing and to enable the election administrators to identify each voter as a known member of fandom.

Although the winner is expected to attend Worldcon or a specific national convention, DUFF delegates generally also tour the country before and/or after the convention in order to meet a variety of fans.

Winning DUFF candidates are expected to write a trip report, which customarily takes the form of a fanzine or a series of fanzine articles. These fanzines are sometimes sold in order to help raise funds towards future DUFF trips. In addition, winners take over the administration of the fund for their region (Australia/NZ or North America) for two years until the next regional DUFF delegate is selected.  At any given time, there are at least two administrators, one for each region.

List of DUFF winners
Past DUFF winners by year.
Westbound races (ex-USA) are marked << and eastbound (ex-Australasia) >>.

	1972	<<	Lesleigh Luttrell	
	1974	>>	Leigh Edmonds	
	1975	<<	Rusty Hevelin	
	1976	>>	Christine McGowan
	1977	<<	Bill Rotsler	
	1978	>>	Paul Stevens	
	1979	<<	Ken Fletcher & Linda Lounsbury	
	1980	>>	Keith Curtis	
	1981	<<	Joyce Scrivner
	1982	>>	Peter Toluzzi	
	1983	<<	Jerry Kaufman	
	1984	>>	Jack Herman
	1985	<<	Marty & Robbie Cantor	
	1986	>>	Nick Stathopoulos, Lewis Morley, Marilyn Pride	
	1987	<<	Lucy Huntzinger
	1988	>>	Terry Dowling	
	1989	<<	John D Berry	
	1990	>>	Greg Turkich	
	1991	<<	Art Widner	
	1992	>>	Roger Weddall
	1993	<<	Dick Smith & Leah Zeldes Smith
	1994	>>	Alan Stewart
	1995	<<	Pat & Roger Sims
	1996	>>	Perry Middlemiss	
	1997	<<	Janice Murray	
	1998	>>	Terry Frost	
	1999	<<	Janice Gelb	
	2000	>>	Cathy Cupitt
	2001	<<	Naomi Fisher & Patrick Molloy	
	2002	>>	Julian Warner
	2003	<<	Guy & Rosy Lillian
       2004	>>	Norman Cates
	2005	<<	Joe Siclari
	2008	<<	Steve and Sue Francis
	2009	>>	Emma Hawkes
	2010	<<	John Hertz
	2011	>>	David Cake
   2012            No race held
	2013	>>	Bill Wright
   2014    <<      Juanita Coulson
   2015            No race held
   2016    >>      Clare McDonald-Sims
   2017    <<      Paul Weimer
   2018    >>      Marlee Jane Ward
   2019            No race held
   2020    <<      Erin Underwood

See also
TransAtlantic Fan Fund (TAFF)
GUFF
FFANZ

External links 
Official DUFF website
Fan Funds website

References

Science fiction fandom
Science fiction organizations